João Diogo Serpa Meira (born 30 April 1987) is a Portuguese professional footballer who plays for Leixões S.C. as a central defender.

Club career
Born in Setúbal, Meira spent until the age of 24 competing in the third and fourth divisions. In the 2010–11 season, he started in all of his 33 league appearances as Atlético Clube de Portugal returned to the Segunda Liga following a lengthy absence.

Meira made his professional debut on 31 July 2011, in a 0–1 home loss against S.C. Freamunde in the first round of the Taça da Liga. On 2 February 2012, he was suspended for eight months after failing a drug test on 29 May of the previous year, in a match against Padroense FC.

For 2012–13, Meira joined C.F. Os Belenenses also in the second tier, signing a three-year contract. He contributed 34 games and two goals, as the Lisbon side returned to the Primeira Liga after three years, as champions with 21 points more than the closest team in the table.

From 2013 to 2015, Meira started in 43 of his 45 league appearances, and Belenenses also qualified for the UEFA Europa League in the latter season. On 23 January 2016, aged 28, he moved abroad for the first time in his career, signing with Chicago Fire FC of Major League Soccer as a free agent. He made his debut on 6 March, as the campaign opened with a 3–4 home defeat to New York City FC.

After a solid performance during a 3–0 win over Philadelphia Union at Toyota Park on 4 September 2016, Meira earned a spot on the Team of the Week. In November 2017, he announced he would not continue the following season.

Meira joined Spanish Segunda División club Lorca FC on 11 January 2018. Eleven days later, however, after the latter failed to meet the terms of the contract, he left.

On 23 March 2018, Meira signed a one-year deal with Vålerenga Fotball from the Norwegian Eliteserien. In late January 2019, he moved to the Romanian Liga I with CS Concordia Chiajna.

References

External links

1987 births
Living people
Sportspeople from Setúbal
Portuguese footballers
Association football defenders
Primeira Liga players
Liga Portugal 2 players
Segunda Divisão players
C.D. Cova da Piedade players
C.D. Mafra players
Atlético Clube de Portugal players
C.F. Os Belenenses players
Vitória F.C. players
Leixões S.C. players
Major League Soccer players
Chicago Fire FC players
Lorca FC players
Eliteserien players
Vålerenga Fotball players
Liga I players
CS Concordia Chiajna players
Portuguese expatriate footballers
Expatriate soccer players in the United States
Expatriate footballers in Spain
Expatriate footballers in Norway
Expatriate footballers in Romania
Portuguese expatriate sportspeople in the United States
Portuguese expatriate sportspeople in Spain
Portuguese expatriate sportspeople in Norway
Portuguese expatriate sportspeople in Romania
Doping cases in association football
Portuguese sportspeople in doping cases